The  is a mini MPV which was manufactured by the Japanese automaker Daihatsu from 2000 to 2005. The name "YRV" is an abbreviation for "Young Recreational Vehicle".

Engines and trim levels
A four-wheel drive system named "4Trak" is available only with the 1.3 L K3-VE engine internationally. A Japanese domestic market turbocharged version was also available. All other versions are equipped with front-wheel drive system. There was also the F-Speed semi-automatic transmission version.

A premium specification was available. This featured the naturally aspirated K3-VE engine, side skirts and five spoke alloy wheels. This version was the highest selling YRV specification of the three and as a result, is the most common in the UK.

The YRV has an option for an electronically controlled 4-speed automatic transmission. The international YRV turbo comes with this transmission as standard equipment.

A four-wheel drive Japanese domestic market version was available at launch and up until discontinuation in 2005. This version had a turbocharged 1.3 L K3-VET engine and an electronically controlled 4-speed automatic transmission or an upgraded 5-speed manual transmission option, exclusively for this model.

Gallery

References 

YRV
Cars introduced in 2000
Mini MPVs
Hatchbacks
Front-wheel-drive vehicles
All-wheel-drive vehicles